Étienne Hansez is a Canadian film producer from Quebec. He is most noted as the producer of Sophie Dupuis's feature films Family First (Chien de garde) and Underground (Souterrain).

Family First was a Canadian Screen Award nominee for Best Picture at the 7th Canadian Screen Awards and a Prix Iris nominee for Best Film at the 20th Quebec Cinema Awards, and Underground was a Canadian Screen Award nominee for Best Picture at the 9th Canadian Screen Awards and a Prix Iris nominee for Best Film at the 23rd Quebec Cinema Awards.

References

External links

Film producers from Quebec
French Quebecers
Living people
Year of birth missing (living people)